The United States Bureau of Efficiency was a United States federal government bureau from 1916 to 1933 formed to create efficiency ratings "for the classified service in the several executive departments in the District of Columbia." Prior to 1916, its efforts had been organized under the Division of Efficiency within the Civil Service Commission.

Herbert D. Brown was appointed by Woodrow Wilson to head the Bureau.

References

Defunct agencies of the United States government
Government agencies established in 1916